La Bruyère is a municipality of Wallonia located in the province of Namur, Belgium. 

The municipality is composed of the following districts: Bovesse, Émines, Meux, Rhisnes, Saint-Denis-Bovesse, Villers-lez-Heest, and Warisoulx. Rhisnes is the administrative seat of the municipality.

See also
 List of protected heritage sites in La Bruyère, Belgium

References

External links 
 
Official website (in French)

Municipalities of Namur (province)